Dee Dee Rescher (born August 28, 1953) is an American actress known for her acting and voice-over roles in both film and television.

Early life
She is the daughter of Jewish cinematographer Gayne Rescher (Jay Gayne Rescher) and actress Ottilie Kruger. Her paternal grandparents were cinematographer Jay Rescher and silent film actress Jean Tolley, and her maternal grandparents were actor Otto Kruger (who was related to South African pioneer and president Paul Kruger) and Sue MacManamy.

Filmography
Famous in Love - episode The Kids Aren't Alright - Brenda (2018)
Captain Underpants: The First Epic Movie - Ms. Tara Ribble (2017)
Star vs. the Forces of Evil - Margaret Skullnick (2015–2017)
Anger Management - Ellen (2014)
Manhattan Love Story - Blanche (2014)
Good Luck Charlie - Shirley (2011)
Mafia II - Additional voices (2010)
God of War: Ghost of Sparta (video game) - The lava Titan Thera (voice) (2010) (credited as Didi Rescher)
My Name Is Earl - Homeless Woman (2009)
Hellboy Animated: Blood and Iron - Additional voices (2007)
W.I.T.C.H. - Professor Vargas (voice) (2006)
The Buzz on Maggie - New Maggie (voice) (2005)
The Life and Times of Juniper Lee - Additional Voices (2005-2007)
The Comeback - Donna Franklin (2005)
Zatch Bell - Additional Voices (2005)
Malcolm in the Middle - Flora (2005)
All Grown Up! - Additional Voices (2005)
JAG - Doris (2005)
My Life as a Teenage Robot - Additional Voices (2003-2007)
What's New, Scooby-Doo? - Sylvie (voice) (2003)
Codename: Kids Next Door - Additional Voices (2002-2008)
Whatever Happened to... Robot Jones? - Additional Voices (2002-2003)
Elise: Mere Mortal - Receptionist (2002)
Even Stevens - Babs Mendel (2002)
Samurai Jack - Additional Voices (2001-2004)
Time Squad - Sister Thornley (voice) (2001-2003)
A Mother's Testimony - Claire (2001)
Grosse Pointe - Gayla Nethercott (2001)
Nothing But the Truth - Angie Fitzsimmons (2000)
The King of Queens - Dorothy (1999–2001)
Party of Five - Mindy (1999)
Johnny Bravo - Guard (voice) (1999)
Lost & Found - Sally (1999)
California Myth - Nurse Reilly (1999)
It's Like, You Know... - Mrs. Beckworthy (1999)
The Powerpuff Girls - Additional Voices (1998-2004)
Recess - Additional Voices (1998)
Looking for Lola - Neighbor (1998)
I Am Weasel - Additional Voices (1997-1999)
Rugrats - Little Girl (1997)
Cow and Chicken - Baboon's Mom (voice) (1997)
Quack Pack - Army General Stetic (voice) (1996)
Something So Right - Bertha (1996)
The Jamie Foxx Show - Mrs. Biacci (1996)
Almost Perfect - Micki Schuster (1996)
Friends - Record Producer (1996)
Cybill - Mrs. Hartford (1996)
Hey Arnold! - Torvald's Mother (1996)
The Grave - Metal Voice (1996)
Dexter's Laboratory - Peltra (voice) and Additional Voices (1996-2003)
Siegfried & Roy: Masters of the Impossible - Additional voices (1996)
Hope and Gloria - Roma (1995)
University Hospital - Dorette Nicholson (1995)
Lois & Clark: The New Adventures of Superman - Mrs. Vale (1995)
Coach - Naomi (1994)
Duckman - Additional voices (1994)
Dream On - Lauren (1994)
The Nanny - Dotty (1993–1999)
The Tower - Gretchen Wallace (1993)
A Murderous Affair: The Carolyn Warmus Story - Linda Viana (1992)
Sibs - Mary (1992)
Howie and Rose - Rita Haber (1991)
Roseanne - Karen (1990)
Midnight Ride - Receptionist (1990)
Empty Nest - Dana (1989–1991)
Just the Ten of Us - Waitress (1989)
Do You Know the Muffin Man? - Helen Wells (1989)
Skin Deep - Bernice Fedderman (1989)
Communion - Mrs. Greenberg (1989)
Divided We Stand (1988)
Night Court - Mandy (1987)
Summer School - Woman at Strip Joint (1987)
Roses Are for the Rich - Carrie (1987)
Hunter - Desk Clerk (episode "Straight to the Heart") (1987)
Wanted: Dead or Alive - Mrs. Farnsworth (1987)
My Sister Sam - Marilyn (1987)
The Underachievers - Female Agent 1 (1987)
Ferris Bueller's Day Off - Bus Driver (1986)
You Again? - Passerby (1986)
Once Bitten - Laundromat Lady (1985)
Heart of a Champion: The Ray Mancini Story - Female Reporter (1985)
Wildside - Fake Annie Oakley (1985)
A Bunny's Tale - Hazel (1985)
Simon & Simon - Doris (1984)
Hotel - Jean Burke (1984)
Airwolf - Mona Kahn (1984)
Empire (1984)
Remington Steele - Charlene (1983)
Three's Company - Dee Dee, the Waitress (1983)
Games Mother Never Taught You - Rita (1982)
Madame's Place - Fatima (1982)
The Scarlett O'Hara War - Phoebe (1980)
Chico and the Man - Nurse Patricia Villa (1976)
Cousins (1976)
Could This Be Love - Renee (1973)

References

External links

1953 births
Living people
Place of birth missing (living people)
American people of German descent
American film actresses
American television actresses
American voice actresses
20th-century American actresses
21st-century American actresses